The 2019 Linköping explosion was a bombing of a residential area in Linköping, Sweden, on June 7, 2019. The police believe that the explosion was part of a rivalry between criminal gangs. Unlike most criminal incidents involving bombs or explosive material in Sweden, the attack damaged more than 150 homes and caused substantial damage to an entire apartment block.  The New York Post stated that 25 people were injured, and Expressen reported that seven were taken to hospital.  Investigators expressed surprise that nobody was killed in the explosion.

Damages were estimated at 80 million SEK.

References 

2019 in Sweden
Linköping
Explosions in Sweden
Explosions in 2019
2019 disasters in Sweden